Morgan Independent School District is a public school district based in Morgan, Texas (USA).

The district has one school that serves students in grades pre-kindergarten through twelve. The Eagle is Morgan ISD's mascot.

Academic achievement
In 2015, the school was rated "Improvement Required" by the Texas Education Agency.

Special programs

Athletics
Morgan High School plays six-man football.

See also

List of school districts in Texas 
List of high schools in Texas

References

External links
Morgan ISD - Official site.

School districts in Bosque County, Texas